The city of Brighton and Hove (made up of the towns of Brighton and Hove) on the south coast of England, UK has a number notable buildings and landmarks.

Extant

Buildings and structures

Bedford Hotel, the present building being a replacement for one of Brighton's oldest and grandest hotels
Brighton Centre, a concert venue and conference centre known for hosting conferences for many of the major political parties of the UK
Brighton Marina
Brighton Pier (also known as Palace Pier, and as Brighton Marine Palace and Pier)
Brighton railway station
The British Engineerium
The Brunswick estate, Hove (a Regency housing development)
Churchill Square, the largest shopping centre in Brighton
The Clock Tower, a prominent landmark between Brighton Station and the seafront
The County Ground, home of Sussex County Cricket Club
Duke of York's Picture House, the oldest continuously operating cinema in Britain
Embassy Court, a starkly modernist 1930s design adjacent to Regency Brunswick Terrace; was a prototype for a proposed redevelopment of the entire seafront. Was refurbished in the mid-2000s.
Falmer Stadium, the home of Brighton and Hove Albion Football Club
The Grand Hotel
The Hanbury Arms incorporates as its ballroom a former mausoleum in an Indian architectural style, built for Edward Sassoon
Hove railway station
The British Airways i360, the tallest structure in the city at 162 m.
Kemp Town (a Regency housing development)
The Lanes, an area of Brighton known for its small, twisting series of pedestrianised streets housing many independent shops
Marine Gate, a 1930s apartment block in the International/Modern style on the eastern approach to Brighton.
The Metropole Hotel
The New England Quarter
North Laine, sometimes incorrectly referred to as "North Laines", North Laine is a group of streets known for their many independent and bohemian shops
The Pylons, a pair of three-sided stone pillars either side of the southbound A23 road marking the boundary point of Brighton, and carrying a message of welcome for visitors
The Regency Town House
The Royal Pavilion
Sassoon Mausoleum
Stanmer House
The University of Sussex, a radical 1960s campus design by Sir Basil Spence, some of which is listed
The West Pier
The Western Pavilion, self-made home of prolific local architect Amon Henry Wilds, son of Amon Wilds and sometime working partner of Charles Busby
White Lodge, The Cliff, Roedean; an atypically small house by Sir Edwin Lutyens, built for Victoria Sackville-West
Withdean Stadium

Churches and places of worship
This is a small list of the most notable. See also List of places of worship in Brighton and Hove.
All Saints Church, Hove
St Bartholomew's Church, Brighton
St Nicholas Church, Brighton
St Paul's Church, Brighton
St Peter's Church, Brighton

Galleries
Phoenix Arts Association

Murals
Brighton Belle street mural, a view of the Brighton Belle train in Brighton Station, painted in the arches of the station's forecourt.
Kissing Coppers, a mural by the artist Banksy on the side of The Prince Albert in Trafalgar Street.

Parks and other open air attractions
Hove Park
Preston Park
Queen's Park
St. Ann's Well Gardens
Stanmer Park
Volk's Electric Railway

Extinct
Brighton and Rottingdean Seashore Electric Railway ("Daddy Long Legs")
The Royal Suspension Chain Pier

See also
Buildings and architecture of Brighton and Hove
List of places of worship in Brighton and Hove (which includes some of those insufficiently notable to have been included in this list).
Brighton and Hove, constituent towns of the city.

Brighton and Hove-related lists
Buildings and structures in Brighton and Hove
Lists of buildings and structures in East Sussex